Patrick Paul Gelsinger (born March 5, 1961) is an American business executive and engineer currently serving as CEO of Intel.

Based mainly in Silicon Valley since the late 1970s, Gelsinger graduated from Stanford University with a master's degree in engineering and was the chief architect of the i486 processor in the 1980s. Before returning to Intel, he was CEO of VMware and president and chief operating officer (COO) at EMC.

Early life and education 
Gelsinger was raised on family farms by his parents, June and Paul Gelsinger, in rural Robesonia, in an Amish and Mennonite part of Pennsylvania. As a teenager, he received a high score on a Lincoln Tech electronics technology test, winning an early-admission scholarship. He then skipped his final year at Conrad Weiser High School and left home at 16 for college. There, he earned the remainder of high school credits for graduation and worked at WFMZ-TV Channel 69 as a technician, while obtaining an associate’s degree from Lincoln Tech in West Orange, New Jersey, in 1979. He moved to Silicon Valley to work at Intel as a quality-control technician, at age 18 in 1979. While at Intel, he earned a bachelor's degree in electrical engineering, graduating magna cum laude from Santa Clara University in 1983, then a master's degree in electrical engineering and computer science from Stanford University in 1985.

Career

Intel (1979-2009) 

Gelsinger first joined Intel at 18 years old in 1979 just after earning an associate degree from Lincoln Tech. He spent much of his career with the company in Oregon, where he maintains a home. In 1987, he co-authored his first book about programming the 80386 microprocessor. Gelsinger was the lead architect of the 4th generation 80486 processor introduced in 1989.  At age 32, he was named the youngest vice president in Intel's history. Mentored by Intel CEO Andrew Grove, Gelsinger became the company's CTO in 2001, leading key technology developments, including Wi-Fi, USB, Intel Core and Intel Xeon processors, and 14 chip projects. He launched the Intel Developer Forum conference as a counterpart to Microsoft's WinHEC.

In September 2009, he left Intel to join EMC as president and chief operating officer.

CEO of VMWare (2012-2021) 
In 2012, he became the CEO of VMware, where Gelsinger became a "seasoned CEO" and gained "new leadership skills."

CEO of Intel (2021-present) 
Gelsinger rejoined Intel as their new CEO on February 15, 2021, after previously having a 30 year-long career at the company in various technical engineering and leadership roles. This followed reorganization pressure, due to languishing share prices, from its newest activist investor Third Point Management. Gelsinger leads Intel's course correction, including construction of two $20 billion Arizona manufacturing plants (fabs) for its planned expansion. Media reported positive responses to Gelsinger's appointment and credited the decision for driving Intel share prices up nearly 8%. On March 23, 2021, Intel shares rose over 6% following Gelsinger’s remarks regarding company strategy.

In May 2021, Gelsinger was interviewed by Lesley Stahl of 60 Minutes. Gelsinger stated that Intel plans to catch up with Taiwanese chip manufacturer TSMC and Korean chip manufacturer Samsung within the next five years. He announced a planned three and a half-billion dollar upgrade to Intel's fab in New Mexico.

In March 2022, Gelsinger personally announced the start of an entirely new fab build for roughly $20 billion near Magdeburg, Saxony-Anhalt, Germany to employ 7,000 people during construction work and 3,000 people in production work in 2027.

Honors and appointments 
He was named a Fellow of the Institute of Electrical and Electronics Engineers in 2008 and serves as a director of the Semiconductor Industry Association (SIA). He is a member of the National Security Telecommunications Advisory Committee (NSTAC).

Gelsinger holds eight design patents, developed for communications, computer architecture and VLSI design.

In 2021, Gelsinger was appointed to serve on President Joe Biden's Council of Advisors on Science and Technology. In this position, he has advised Biden on the chips shortage and advocated for the passage of the CHIPS and Science Act. Gelsinger was a guest at Biden's State of the Union Address in March 2022. Biden has spoken in favor of Intel's investment in fabrication plants in the U.S. and has visited the $20 billion facility planned in Ohio alongside Gelsinger.

Honors 
In October 2021, Gelsinger was inducted into Indiana Wesleyan University's Society of World Changers. While speaking on campus he received an honorary doctor of science degree and a bronze bust of Gelsinger was placed in the university's library rotunda. In 2022, he was awarded an honorary Doctorate of Engineering from Ohio State University.

Personal life 
Gelsinger and his wife, Linda, are Christians who "support multiple worthy causes", including sponsorship of disaster relief medical teams. In 2013, Gelsinger co-founded Transforming the Bay with Christ (TBC), a coalition of business leaders, venture capitalists, non-profit leaders and pastors that aims to convert one million people over the next decade. He helped establish the Sacramento-area Christian institution William Jessup University, from which he also received an honorary doctorate. Gelsinger and his wife have 4 children.

Bibliography

References

External links 
 Patrick Gelsinger at Intel
 

Intel people
Living people
American chief operating officers
American technology chief executives
American chief technology officers
American Christians
1962 births
Santa Clara University alumni
Stanford University School of Engineering alumni
Fellow Members of the IEEE